Moran Rosenblatt (born ) is an Israeli film, television and theatre actress.

Biography 
Moran Rosenblatt was born in Tel Aviv, and was raised in Tel Aviv city centre. At the age of six, her family moved to Tokhnit Lamed. She graduated secondary school at the Tichon Hadash.

She studied in the Nissan Nativ Acting Studio, Eyal Cohen and Ruth Dytches' HaDerech Studio.

In 2016, she finished her screenwriting studies in the Sam Spiegel Film and Television School.

Career 
Rosenblatt won Best Actress at the Jerusalem Film Festival for her 2011 role in Lipstikka then in 2015, won the Best Actress Ophir Award for Wedding Doll. She was cast in television series Fauda. In 2021, she starred in the Netflix series Hit & Run.

Personal life
Rosenblatt identifies as lesbian. In October 2017, it was published that she was in a relationship with the actress Joy Rieger. In September 2018, they broke up.

References 

1985 births
Living people
Actresses from Tel Aviv
Israeli film actresses
Israeli television actresses
Israeli stage actresses
Israeli lesbian actresses